The Torneo Apertura 2008 (official name: Copa Tigo 2008) was the football (soccer) tournament that opened the season in the Paraguayan first division.

The tournament began on February 15 and ended on June 29 with the participation of 12 teams, playing a two-legged all play all system. Club Libertad accumulated the most points and became the champions, securing a spot for the Copa Libertadores 2009.

Standings

Results

{| class="wikitable" style="text-align:center; float:left; margin-right:1em;"
|- 
!colspan=3 |Matchday 1
|- 
!width="150"|Home Team
!width="75"|Result
!width="150"|Away Team

{| class="wikitable" style="text-align:center; float:left; margin-right:1em;"
|- 
!colspan=3 |Matchday 2
|- 
!width="150"|Home Team
!width="75"|Result
!width="150"|Away Team

{| class="wikitable" style="text-align:center; float:left; margin-right:1em;"
|- 
!colspan=3 |Matchday 3
|- 
!width="150"|Home Team
!width="75"|Result
!width="150"|Away Team

{| class="wikitable" style="text-align:center; float:left; margin-right:1em;"
|- 
!colspan=3 |Matchday 4
|- 
!width="150"|Home Team
!width="75"|Result
!width="150"|Away Team

{| class="wikitable" style="text-align:center; float:left; margin-right:1em;"
|- 
!colspan=3 |Matchday 5
|- 
!width="150"|Home Team
!width="75"|Result
!width="150"|Away Team

{| class="wikitable" style="text-align:center; float:left; margin-right:1em;"
|- 
!colspan=3 |Matchday 6
|- 
!width="150"|Home Team
!width="75"|Result
!width="150"|Away Team

{| class="wikitable" style="text-align:center; float:left; margin-right:1em;"
|- 
!colspan=3 |Matchday 7
|- 
!width="150"|Home Team
!width="75"|Result
!width="150"|Away Team

{| class="wikitable" style="text-align:center; float:left; margin-right:1em;"
|- 
!colspan=3 |Matchday 8
|- 
!width="150"|Home Team
!width="75"|Result
!width="150"|Away Team

{| class="wikitable" style="text-align:center; float:left; margin-right:1em;"
|- 
!colspan=3 |Matchday 9
|- 
!width="150"|Home Team
!width="75"|Result
!width="150"|Away Team

{| class="wikitable" style="text-align:center; float:left; margin-right:1em;"
|- 
!colspan=3 |Matchday 10
|- 
!width="150"|Home Team
!width="75"|Result
!width="150"|Away Team

{| class="wikitable" style="text-align:center; float:left; margin-right:1em;"
|- 
!colspan=3 |Matchday 11
|- 
!width="150"|Home Team
!width="75"|Result
!width="150"|Away Team

{| class="wikitable" style="text-align:center; float:left; margin-right:1em;"
|- 
!colspan=3 |Matchday 12
|- 
!width="150"|Home Team
!width="75"|Result
!width="150"|Away Team

{| class="wikitable" style="text-align:center; float:left; margin-right:1em;"
|- 
!colspan=3 |Matchday 13
|- 
!width="150"|Home Team
!width="75"|Result
!width="150"|Away Team

{| class="wikitable" style="text-align:center; float:left; margin-right:1em;"
|- 
!colspan=3 |Matchday 14
|- 
!width="150"|Home Team
!width="75"|Result
!width="150"|Away Team
|-

{| class="wikitable" style="text-align:center; float:left; margin-right:1em;"
|- 
!colspan=3 |Matchday 15
|- 
!width="150"|Home Team
!width="75"|Result
!width="150"|Away Team

{| class="wikitable" style="text-align:center; float:left; margin-right:1em;"
|- 
!colspan=3 |Matchday 16
|- 
!width="150"|Home Team
!width="75"|Result
!width="150"|Away Team

{| class="wikitable" style="text-align:center; float:left; margin-right:1em;"
|- 
!colspan=3 |Matchday 17
|- 
!width="150"|Home Team
!width="75"|Result
!width="150"|Away Team

{| class="wikitable" style="text-align:center; float:left; margin-right:1em;"
|- 
!colspan=3 |Matchday 18
|- 
!width="150"|Home Team
!width="75"|Result
!width="150"|Away Team
|-

{| class="wikitable" style="text-align:center; float:left; margin-right:1em;"
|- 
!colspan=3 |Matchday 19
|- 
!width="150"|Home Team
!width="75"|Result
!width="150"|Away Team
|-

{| class="wikitable" style="text-align:center; float:left; margin-right:1em;"
|- 
!colspan=3 |Matchday 20
|- 
!width="150"|Home Team
!width="75"|Result
!width="150"|Away Team

{| class="wikitable" style="text-align:center; float:left; margin-right:1em;"
|- 
!colspan=3 |Matchday 21
|- 
!width="150"|Home Team
!width="75"|Result
!width="150"|Away Team

{| class="wikitable" style="text-align:center; float:left; margin-right:1em;"
|- 
!colspan=3 |Matchday 22
|- 
!width="150"|Home Team
!width="75"|Result
!width="150"|Away Team

Top scorers

References 
 Asociación Paraguaya de Fútbol Website
 Paraguay 2008 by Eli Schmerler and Juan Pablo Andrés at RSSSF

Apertura